The 1st Far Eastern Championship Games were held in 1–9 February 1913 in Manila, Philippines. The inaugural tournament was officially opened by Governor General William Cameron Forbes at the Carnival Grounds in Malate, Manila. Six countries participated at the tournament.

Venues
 Carnival Grounds, Manila

Participants

Sports

References

Far Eastern Championship Games
Far Eastern Championship Games
Far Eastern Championship Games
Far Eastern Championship Games
International sports competitions hosted by the Philippines
Multi-sport events in the Philippines
February 1913 sports events
20th century in Manila
Sports competitions in Manila